Eulophila zollingeri, commonly known as the carrion orchid or 无叶美冠兰 (wu ye mei guan lan), is a plant in the orchid family and is native to areas from tropical and subtropical Asia to Queensland. It is a leafless, brownish terrestrial orchid with up to forty reddish brown, sharply scented flowers with a dark red and yellow labellum. It grows in decaying wood in and near rainforests.

Description
Eulophia zollingeri is a terrestrial herb with an underground pseudobulb. It has no green leaves but fleshy, pointed bracts on the flowering stem. The flowers have a sharp, unpleasant odour. The middle lobe curves downward and has short, thick hairs whilst the side lobes are erect. Flowering occurs between December and February in Australia and from April to May in China

Taxonomy and naming
The carrion orchid was first formally described in 1857 by Heinrich Gustav Reichenbach who gave it the name Cyrtopera zollingeri and published the description in Bonplandia. In 1905, Johannes Jacobus Smith changed the name to Eulophia zollingeri.

Distribution and habitat
Eulophia zollingeri grows in and near the edges rainforest where there is rotting wood. It occurs in China, Taiwan, India, Indonesia, Japan, Malaysia, New Guinea, the Philippines, Sri Lanka, Thailand, Vietnam and tropical northern Queensland.

References

zollingeri
Plants described in 1822
Orchids of China
Orchids of Taiwan
Orchids of India
Orchids of Indonesia
Orchids of Japan
Orchids of Malaysia
Orchids of New Guinea
Orchids of the Philippines
Orchids of Sri Lanka
Orchids of Thailand
Orchids of Vietnam
Orchids of Queensland